The 1997–98 EHF Women's Cup Winners' Cup was the twenty-second edition of EHF's competition for women's handball national cup champions. It ran from October 2, 1997, to May 16, 1998.

1995 EHF Cup runner-up Bækkelagets SK defeated Kras Zagreb, which lost the final for the second time in three years, to become the first Norwegian women's team to win an EHF/IHF competition.

Results

References

Women's EHF Cup Winners' Cup
1997 in handball
1998 in handball